Abel Carter Wilder (March 18, 1828 – December 22, 1875) was a U.S. Representative from Kansas.

Biography
Born in Mendon, Massachusetts, Wilder completed preparatory studies and engaged in mercantile pursuits.  He moved to Rochester, New York, and continued mercantile pursuits.  He moved to Leavenworth, Kansas in 1857 and again engaged in mercantile pursuits.  He served as delegate to the Osawatomie convention in 1859.
He served as delegate to the Republican National Convention in 1860 and elected its chairman. He served as a captain in the Kansas brigade for one year in the Civil War.

Wilder was elected as a Republican to the Thirty-Eighth Congress (March 4, 1863 – March 3, 1865).  He served as delegate to the Republican National Conventions in 1864, 1868, and 1872.  He returned to Rochester, New York, in 1865 and published the Morning and Evening Express until 1868, when he retired from active business pursuits.

Wilder was elected mayor of Rochester in 1872, but resigned in 1873.  He died in San Francisco, California, December 22, 1875, while there for his health.  He was interred in Mount Hope Cemetery, Rochester, New York.

References
 Retrieved on 2009-05-07

1828 births
1875 deaths
Burials at Mount Hope Cemetery (Rochester)
Mayors of Rochester, New York
People from Mendon, Massachusetts
People of Kansas in the American Civil War
Burials in New York (state)
Union Army officers
New York (state) Republicans
Republican Party members of the United States House of Representatives from Kansas
19th-century American politicians
Military personnel from Massachusetts